João Lourenço is the president of Angola.

João Lourenço may also refer to:

 João Lourenço (footballer, born 1942)
 João Lourenço (footballer, born 2005)
 João Lourenço (cyclist)